OFB  may refer to:

 Ordnance Factories Board, an Indian industrial setup engaged in the production of arms, ammunition and other equipment for military and civilian applications
 Austrian Football Association (German: Österreichischer Fußball-Bund, ÖFB)
 Outflow boundary, in meteorology, the leading edge of precipitation-cooled air emanating from a thunderstorm
 Output feedback, a mode of operation for block ciphers in cryptography
 Overseas Filipino Bank, a state-owned bank in the Philippines
 Oklahoma Farm Bureau
 Open for Business (blog)|Open for Business]], an online general interest publication with a technology focus
 The Sims 2: Open for Business
 Oregon Food Bank
 OFB (rap group), or Original Farm Boys, a UK drill music group
Operation Forth Bridge, the national plan for handling the death of Prince Philip